Lynne Ramsay (born 5 December 1969) is a Scottish film director, writer, producer, and cinematographer best known for the feature films Ratcatcher (1999), Morvern Callar (2002), We Need to Talk About Kevin (2011), and You Were Never Really Here (2017).

Ramsay began her career by garnering attention through her short films beginning with “Small Deaths”, followed by “Kill the Day” and “Gasman”, all receiving awards and nominations. Gaining recognition from these films she was approached to write a treatment that would eventually become her debut feature film Ratcatcher funded by BBC Scotland and Pathé. Ramsay’s Ratcatcher was given many awards along with Ramsay being awarded  BAFTA’s Award for Outstanding Debut by a British Writer, Director or Producer.

Her films are marked by a fascination with children and young people and the recurring themes of grief, guilt, death, and its aftermath. They are low on dialogue and explicit story exposition, and instead use images, vivid details, music, and sound design to create their worlds. In April 2013, she was selected as a member of the main competition jury at the 2013 Cannes Film Festival. In 2015, she was named as a member of the jury for the main competition at the 2015 Venice Film Festival.

Early life and education
Ramsay was born in Glasgow on 5 December 1969. She studied fine art and photography at Napier College, Edinburgh. Ramsay cites watching Maya Deren's film Meshes of the Afternoon in school as a turning point in her career, inspiring her to apply to film school on a whim and encouraging her turn towards filmmaking. Originally focused solely on cinematography she eventually moved toward directing feeling a stronger connection to being a director and documentarian. In 1995, she graduated from the National Film and Television School in Beaconsfield, England, where she specialised in cinematography and direction.

Career

Short films
Ramsay won the 1996 Cannes Prix de Jury for her graduation short film, "Small Deaths". Her second short film, "Kill the Day", won the Clermont Ferrand Prix du Jury; her third, "Gasman", won her another Cannes Prix du Jury in addition to a Scottish BAFTA for Best Short Film.

"Small Deaths" (1996), is Ramsay's debut short film that she completed as her graduating film at the UK's National Film and Television School. It is a series of three vignettes of children grappling with familial realities and the repercussions of their actions. Ramsay is the writer, director and cinematographer for this film.

"Kill the Day" (1997), written and directed by Ramsay, captures a day in the life of a heroin addict recently released from jail, and in the process inventively probes the inner workings of memory.

"Gasman" (1997), also written and directed by Ramsay, is about a brother and sister who attend a Christmas party with their father, and encounter two other children who are strangely familiar with him.

"Swimmer" (2012), was co-commissioned by BBC Films, Film4 and the London Organising Committee of the Olympic and Paralympic Games. The short was nominated for the British Independent Film Awards (BIFA) in the category for Best Short Film. It won a BAFTA Award for Best Short Film at the 66th British Academy Film Awards in 2013.

Feature films
Ratcatcher (1999), Ramsay's debut feature, won critical acclaim and numerous awards. It was screened at the 1999 Cannes Film Festival and opened the Edinburgh International Film Festival, winning her the Guardian New Directors prize. She also won the Carl Foreman Award for Newcomer in British Film at the 2000 BAFTA Awards, the Sutherland Trophy at the London Film Festival and the Silver Hugo for Best Director at the Chicago International Film Festival.

Morvern Callar (2002), won Samantha Morton the British Independent Film Award for Best Actress, and Kathleen McDermott the Scottish BAFTA Award for Best Actress. It also won the 2002 C.I.C.A.E. Award and the Award of The Youth at the 2002 Cannes Film Festival. The motion picture soundtrack includes tracks from Stereolab, Aphex Twin, Broadcast, Velvet Underground, and Nancy Sinatra. Ramsay is credited as the writer and director. The film is based on Alan Warner's 1995 novel of the same name, Morvern Callar. It was featured in the Directors Fortnight for the Cannes Film Festival 2002 and then went on to open the Edinburgh International Film Festival in August of the same year. The film also featured at the Telluride, Toronto, San Sebastian, Dinard and Stockholm Film Festivals of 2002. It was nominated for seven British Independent Film Awards.

In 2001, it was announced she was slated to direct the adaptation of Alice Sebold's The Lovely Bones, which she had read in a manuscript form prior to its publication. She experienced great frustration in her involvement with adapting the novel, during which personal and professional problems saw her step away from the project in 2004, with the job of directing eventually going to Peter Jackson, whose version of the film received largely negative reviews. She stated in an interview: "People started to call it 'The Lovely Money,' they were getting greedy around it. And I could feel the vibes. It became like the Holy Bible, I kept handing in drafts and I thought they were good, but it was like 'But that's not exactly like the book, the book's going to be a success.' That was the mistake they made with the project." She stated additionally that she considered Jackson's interpretation of the film, with a desire to stick as closely as possible to the original story, as partially responsible for what she considered the lacklustre quality of the finished product.

We Need to Talk About Kevin (2011), was Ramsay's next feature-length film in which she was the writer, producer and director. The film, based on Lionel Shriver's novel, is about a mother dealing with the aftermath of a school massacre committed by her son. Budgetary difficulties held the production up, but after several script drafts, the film, which employed a fragmented, elliptical narrative and starred Tilda Swinton as the tormented mother, premiered in 2011, to great acclaim at the Cannes Film Festival. Ramsay went on to receive a BAFTA nomination for Best Director as well as taking the Best Director prize at the British Independent Film Awards, and a win for Best Film Screenplay at the Writer's Guild of Great Britain.

In 2013, Ramsay was slated to direct Jane Got a Gun. Natalie Portman signed on to star and produce the film as the farmer wife of an outlaw husband, who, after his gang turns on him, she must defend with the help of an old lover. In March 2013, Ramsay left the project due to creative differences with producers and funders, including over the latter's demand for a happy ending.  She was replaced by Gavin O'Connor. Actor Jude Law also left the production shortly after. This caused significant backlash towards the director, during the fallout she would go to Santorini where she worked on the script that would be her next film You Were Never Really Here.

Ramsay was planning to direct a modern adaptation of Herman Melville's Moby Dick. She has stated that the film will be set in space, and deal with themes of psychology and claustrophobia, quoting "So we're creating a whole new world, and a new alien. [It's] a very psychological piece, mainly taking place in the ship, a bit like Das Boot, so it's quite claustrophobic. It's another monster movie, cos the monster's Ahab." The film has yet to come to fruition.

Ramsay directed You Were Never Really Here, an adaptation of Jonathan Ames's novella of the same name. It premiered to wide critical acclaim in competition at the 70th Cannes Film Festival in 2017, where it received a seven-minute standing ovation, and Ramsay won the Best Screenplay award. The film, starring Joaquin Phoenix, was released by Amazon Studios.

In 2018, she revealed she had started writing  a script that she describes as an "epic environmental horror". In November 2020, it was announced Ramsay would be filming an adaptation of Stephen King's The Girl Who Loved Tom Gordon. and adapted Margaret Atwood's Stone Mattress  In November 2022, it was announced that Ramsay will be directing an adaptation of Ariana Harwicz’s novel Die, My Love, which will be produced by Martin Scorsese and Jennifer Lawrence, the latter of whom will additionally star as a woman whose driven to insanity by her marriage and childbirth.

Music promos
Ramsay directed the promotional video for the Manchester-based indie-rock band Doves' single "Black and White Town", which was released on 7 February 2005. However, Ramsay's version was re-edited and the released version was significantly different from her original piece.

Themes 
Many of Ramsay’s film explores themes of death, rebirth and childhood.

Ratcatcher reflects these themes through the death of a young child and rebirth for the protagonist in moving out of Glasgow.

Morvern Callar feature these themes in the visual metaphor of a maggot and carrot as a symbolization of death and transformation.

Critical response

In 2007, Ramsay was rated number 12 in Guardian Unlimited's list of the world's 40 best directors working at that time.

Sean O'Hagan wrote in The Guardian that "Ramsay is entertaining company, whether talking about the art films she loves —by Bergman, Cassavetes, Fassbinder— or railing against the 'bullshitters and backstabbers' of the film industry."

The Harvard Film Archive describes Ramsay as "an uncompromising filmmaker fascinated by the tremendous power of cinema to appeal directly to the senses and awaken new depths in our audio-visual imagination. Immersive and at times almost overwhelming, Ramsay's films abound with uncommon imagery arresting for its remarkable use of texture, composition, color, music and sound."

In her The New York Times biography, Ramsay's work is described as having a "gritty, realistic visual style that demands attention."

Tilda Swinton, whom Ramsay directed in We Need to Talk About Kevin, called her "the real McCoy", saying, "She is one of those rare directors who creates the kind of films that just would not be there if she didn't make them."

British film critic Jonathan Romney, when speaking on We Need to Talk About Kevin, opined "Ramsay thinks not in concepts but in images. She doesn't make intellectual films, but ones that are close to music, taking visuals to the point of abstraction."

Los Angeles Times columnist Mark Olsen considered Ramsay "one of the leading lights of young British cinema", describing her additionally as "among the most celebrated British filmmakers of her generation."

Filmography

Film

Short films

Music videos 
 "Black and White Town" (2005)

Awards and nominations

On 8 October 2013, Ramsay was awarded an honorary doctorate by the University of Edinburgh for her contribution to British film.

Personal life
Ramsay was previously married to Rory Stewart Kinnear, a writer and musician. She has one daughter.

See also

 List of female film and television directors 
 Women's cinema

References

External links

Profile: Lynne Ramsay AcademyFilms.com

1969 births
Living people
Scottish film directors
Scottish screenwriters
Scottish film producers
Scottish cinematographers
Scottish women film directors
Scottish women cinematographers
Alumni of the National Film and Television School
Outstanding Debut by a British Writer, Director or Producer BAFTA Award winners
Film people from Glasgow
Alumni of Edinburgh Napier University
WFTV Award winners
Cannes Film Festival Award for Best Screenplay winners